Leonel Adrián Pernía (born September 27, 1975 in Buenos Aires) is an Argentine racing driver. He has run in different series, with major success in TC 2000, where he finished 3rg in 2009 and 2nd in 2010 driving for the works Honda team.

He is the son of former footballer and racing driver Vicente Pernía, and brother of Spanish international footballer Mariano Pernía. In fact, he played for Boca Juniors First Division in 1997, in the National Professional Soccer League the next two years, then raced at the Argentine Turismo Nacional in 2000 and 2001. Because of the crisis, he returned to the United States to compete in the Major Indoor Soccer League from 2002 to 2005.

In 2006, Pernía retired from football and returned to Argentina to race professionally. That year he competed at the TC Pista in a Chevrolet (12th) and the TC2000 in a Honda (3 races). The next season, Pernía raced two TC Pista races, half of the TC2000 season in a Fineschi Honda and the rest of the year in a works Honda, ending up 13th.

The next years, he continued racing for Honda and was vice-championship in 2009 and 2010. He also raced at the Turismo Nacional Clase 3 in 2008, the Top Race V6 in 2009 and Turismo Carretera since 2009. In 2009 he also won the Drivers Masters karting all-star race in the downtown Buenos Aires streets.

In 2013, 2014 and 2015 he was runner-up in Super TC 2000 (successor to TC 2000) behind Matías Rossi and Néstor Girolami (twice), already with the Renault Argentina factory team. In 2018 he won the Turismo Nacional Clase 3 championship with Chetta Racing and the following year the Súper TC 2000 with Renault.

Career

Complete World Touring Car Championship results
(key) (Races in bold indicate pole position) (Races in italics indicate fastest lap)

References

External links
 

1975 births
TC 2000 Championship drivers
Argentine racing drivers
Living people
Top Race V6 drivers
Turismo Carretera drivers
World Touring Car Championship drivers
Súper TC 2000 drivers